Ed Roberts (born June 27, 1958 in Oklahoma City, Oklahoma) is an American poet, writer and publisher currently based in Yukon, Oklahoma.

Early life
Ed Roberts was born June 27, 1958 in Oklahoma City, Oklahoma. He graduated Putnam City High School in 1976. After a life-threatening illness in the year 2000 Roberts began to publicly share his poetry.

Poetry

Style and influences
His poems are mainly written in free verse, ignoring traditional rules such as regular meter, rhyme, and alliteration. According to Roberts these characteristics of poetry "would not translate the same in other languages." Roberts had a poem translated into Cherokee for inclusion in the anthology Amaravati Poetic Prism 2019. Roberts writing is influenced by his Oklahoma and Cherokee heritage.

Publications and honors
Roberts has given readings and speeches about poetry in schools, universities and at poetry festivals. In 2005 Roberts represented the United States with nine other writers at the Odyssey International Festival in Amman, Jordan. He serves as the parliamentarian for the Poetry Society of Oklahoma. Roberts is the author of ten poetry collections. Roberts’ poems have also been published by The Poetic Voices Magazine and The Poetry Sharings Journal.

Bibliography

Poetry for life series
Poetry For Life The Poetry For Life Project, 2006. 
Save Our Selves
A Walk Through Time

Poetry collections
A Poet's Last Stand. A Collection of Poems & Song Lyrics. Virtualbookworm.com Publishing, 2002  / Createspace, 2014. 
Whispers, Tears, Prayers and Hope. Poetry & Song Lyrics. VonChasePublishing Company, 2008.  / Createspace, 2016. 
Everything Must Have a Beginning, a Middle, and an End Createspace, 2014. 
When Words Escape You, You Can Use Mine Createspace, 2014. 
I'm Still Standing Createspace, 2014. 
Sometimes We Wait Createspace, 2016. 
From the Pill to the Bottle to You Createspace, 2016. 
The Traveler Createspace, 2016. 
Words for the Heart from over 40 years of Marriage Createspace, 2017.

Anthologies

 Iyengar-Paddy, Padmaja, ed. Amaravati Poetic Prism 2017 Cultural Centre of Vijayawada & Amaravati (CCVA), Vijayawada, 2017. 
 Iyengar-Paddy, Padmaja, ed. Amaravati Poetic Prism 2018 Cultural Centre of Vijayawada & Amaravati (CCVA), Vijayawada, 2018. 
 Iyengar-Paddy, Padmaja, ed. Amaravati Poetic Prism 2019 Cultural Centre of Vijayawada & Amaravati (CCVA), Vijayawada, 2020.  
 Dravis, Betty and Von, Chase, eds. Dream Reachers II VonChasePublishing, 2011.

References

External links
Interview with Judyth Piazza CEO of the Student Operated Press
 Putnam City Alumni Association
 Ed Roberts official website

American male poets
1958 births
Living people
Poets from Oklahoma
Writers from Oklahoma City
People from Yukon, Oklahoma
20th-century American poets
20th-century American male writers
21st-century American poets
21st-century American male writers
Cherokee writers
20th-century Native Americans
21st-century Native Americans